Bernie was an unincorporated community in Lincoln County, West Virginia, United States. It lies along Parsner Creek West Virginia on Lincoln County Route 40/1. It lies approximately 8.5 air miles southeast of the town of Hamlin, the county seat of Lincoln County. Its elevation is 833 feet (254 m). It had a post office that was approved June 12, 1893 but then closed on January 8, 1962; there were four Post Masters and the USGS maps of that era show Bernie on West Virginia, Lincoln County, Hager Quad at Location DD: 38.180373, -82.0117982. The first post office was originally proposed to be named "Pin Hook", but was changed to the unincorporated community name of Bernie  with an estimated population of 200 according to the initial post office application and was located on the property of S.A. Egnor, and was later moved approximately 1,800 feet to the property of Alamander Elkins, because he had free gas for heat, on June 16, 1897, and was operated at that location until it was closed in 1962. After closing the mail for Bernie was rerouted through multiple post offices but the majority went to Griffithsville, West Virginia with the remaining through Alkol, West Virginia.

References

Lincoln County, West Virginia